Alberto Socías Olmos (born 16 May 1973 in Valencia) is a former Spanish rugby union player and coach. He plays as a centre.
He is the younger brother of Antonio Socías, who also was former Spanish international.

Career 
His first international cap was during a match against Italy, on 7 May 1994, at Parma. He was part of the 1999 Rugby World Cup roster, where he played two matches. His last international cap was during a match against Netherlands, on 6 April 2002 at Murcia.

Coaching career 
He coached the Spain national rugby sevens team from 2012 until 2015, when he José Ignacio Inchausti replaced Socías due to criteria differences with the FER. Currently, he is the coach of CR Les Abelles.

References

External links 
 

1973 births
Living people
Sportspeople from Valencia
Spanish rugby union coaches
Spanish rugby union players
Rugby union centres
Spain international rugby union players